Cratena simba is a species of sea slug, an aeolid nudibranch, a marine gastropod mollusc in the family Facelinidae.

Distribution
This species was described from Tanzania. It has been reported widely in the Indo-Pacific region as far East as Australia.

References

External links
 

Facelinidae
Gastropods described in 1970